The 2020 Campbell Fighting Camels football team represented Campbell University in the 2020–21 NCAA Division I FCS football season. They were led by eighth-year head coach Mike Minter and played their home games at Barker–Lane Stadium. They were third-year members of the Big South Conference.

Previous season

The Fighting Camels finished the 2019 season 6–5, 3–3 in Big South play to finish in fourth place.

Schedule
Campbell originally had games scheduled against Davidson (September 5), Elon (September 19), Hampton (October 17), and Monmouth (October 24), but they were canceled before the start of the season due to the COVID-19 pandemic.

Game summaries

at Georgia Southern

at Coastal Carolina

at Appalachian State

at Wake Forest

References

Campbell
Campbell Fighting Camels football seasons
College football winless seasons
Campbell Fighting Camels football